Getting to Know is the fifth album by Filipino singer, Ariel Rivera. The album was successful and earned him a platinum album.

Track listing
 "In A Lover's Eyes"
 "It's You I Cannot Do Without"
 "It's Still You"
 "Pangako"
 "Di Mo Na Ba Ako Mahal"
 "Still In Love"
 "Getting To Know Each Other"
 "Lessons Learned"
 "Too Much To Ask"
 "Tayo Pa Rin"
 "Biglang-Bigla"
 "Para Bang Kahapon Lang"

1996 albums
Ariel Rivera albums